Ajayan Bala is an Indian writer, film director and screenplay writer from Thirukalukundram, Tamilnadu. His book Ulaka cin̲imā varalār̲u :  maun̲ayukam 1894-1929 was awarded as best book in the fine arts section by Tamil Nadu Government in 2007. He has written several fiction and non-fiction works in Tamil. He has written a history serial in the popular Tamil magazine Ananda Vikatan.

He has written story and screen play for the movies Chennaiyil Oru Naal, Vana Yuddham, Manithan, and has worked as assistant director for Chithiram Pesuthadi, Vaalmiki, Madrasapattinam, Thenmerku Paruvakaatru, and Krishnaveni Panjaalai. He has also directed one of the chapters in the horror anthology 6 Athiyayam.

Bibliography

Novels
 Pakalmeenkal (published as a serial in Kalki)

Short story collections
 Mayilvakanan and other stories (Marutha Pathippakam)
 Moondravathu Arai Nanbanin Kathal Kathai 
 Ajayan Bala Sirukathaikal (Nathan Pathippakam)
 Muthukkal Pathu (Amrutha Pathippakam)

Translated Screenplays
 The Battle of Algiers
 Bicycle Thieves

Biographies
 Ambedkar
 Annai Theresa
 Oviyar Van Gogh
 Karl Marx
 Charlie Chaplin
 Che Guevara
 Nelson Mandela
 Nethaji Subhas Chandra Bose
 Periyar
 Martin Luther King

Other Non-Fiction
 Mudivatra Kalaignan: Marlon Brando
 Sumar Ezhuthalanum Super Star-um
 Semmozhi Sirpigal (Life of 100 Tamil scholars)
 Ulaka cin̲imā varalār̲u :  maun̲ayukam 1894-1929

Filmography

As director
 6 Athiyayam (23 Feb 2018)

As writer
 Chennaiyil Oru Naal (2013) 
 Vana Yuddham (2013) (Tamil dubbed version)
 Manithan (2016)
 Diya (2018)
 Lakshmi (2018)
 Nethraa (2019)
 Watchman (2019)
 Memories (2021)
 Thalaivi (2021)
 Narkali (2021)

web series 
 love bullet (7 July 2021)

References

Living people
Year of birth missing (living people)
Screenwriters from Chennai
Film directors from Chennai
Indian male screenwriters
Tamil film directors
Tamil screenwriters